Jordã Lima Rodrigues (born August 10, 1983, in Salvador), simply known as Jordã, is a Brazilian footballer who plays for URT as midfielder.

Career statistics

References

External links

1983 births
Living people
Brazilian footballers
Association football midfielders
Campeonato Brasileiro Série C players
Clube Atlético Linense players
Brasiliense Futebol Clube players
Clube Atlético Votuporanguense players
Comercial Futebol Clube (Ribeirão Preto) players
União Recreativa dos Trabalhadores players
Uberlândia Esporte Clube players
Sportspeople from Salvador, Bahia